Vitis pseudoreticulata, commonly known as the wild Chinese grape or eastern Chinese grape, is a Chinese liana (woody vine) in the grape family. It is native to eastern China, specifically the provinces of Anhui, Fujian, Guangdong, Guangxi, Henan, Hubei, Hunan, Jiangsu, Jiangxi, and Zhejiang. It has been observed to be resistant to damage from moisture, white rot, anthracnose, and Downy mildew.

Gallery
https://commons.wikimedia.org/wiki/File:V._pseudoreticulata_2.jpg
https://commons.wikimedia.org/wiki/File:V._pseudoreticulata_3.jpg
https://commons.wikimedia.org/wiki/File:V._pseudoreticulata_4.jpg
https://commons.wikimedia.org/wiki/File:V._pseudoreticulata_5.jpg

External links
Plants of the World Online: Vitis pseudoreticulata
Flora of China: Vitis pseudoreticulata 
Vitis pseudoreticulata (Chinese wild grapevine)
Yuexi Plant Journal

References

pseudoreticulata
Endemic flora of China
Plants described in 1979